František Kundert (28 July 1891 – 27 February 1957) was a cyclist. He competed for Bohemia at the 1912 Summer Olympics and for Czechoslovakia at the 1920 and 1924 Summer Olympics.

References

External links
 

1891 births
1957 deaths
Cyclists at the 1912 Summer Olympics
Cyclists at the 1920 Summer Olympics
Cyclists at the 1924 Summer Olympics
Olympic cyclists of Bohemia
Olympic cyclists of Czechoslovakia
Sportspeople from Prague